Colin Frederick Bazley (born 27 June 1935) is a retired bishop in the Church of England. He was a bishop in Chile from 1969 until his retirement in 2000.

Early life, education and family
The son of Reginald Samuel Bazley and Isabella Davies, Bazley attended Birkenhead School before matriculating at St Peter's Hall, Oxford (whence he gained a Bachelor of Arts {BA} in 1957 and an Oxford Master of Arts {MA Oxon} in 1961) then training for ministry at Tyndale Hall, Bristol (a predecessor of Trinity College, Bristol). He was ordained at Liverpool Cathedral by Clifford Martin, Bishop of Liverpool — deacon at Michaelmas 1959 and priest at Michaelmas 1960 —, serving his Title (curacy) at St Leonard’s, Bootle. In 1960, he married Barbara Helen Griffiths; they have three daughters, two of whom married Chileans; and eight grandchildren. One of Bazley's sons-in-law is Enrique Lago, Bishop of Concepción (Anglican Church of Chile).

Missionary and bishop
In 1962, Bazley left for central Chile as a missionary with the South American Mission Society (SAMS), in which general region he stayed until 2000.

As a missionary priest, he also served as Rural Dean of Chol-Chol until 1966 and then as Archdeacon of Temuco or of Cautin and Malleco until his appointment to the episcopate. He was consecrated on Whitsun (Pentecost, 25 May) 1969 as Assistant Bishop for Cautin and Malleco, (but also called Assistant Bishop in Southern Chile) which See he served until 1975, when he was translated to become Assistant Bishop for Santiago. He remained in that post until 1977, when he became diocesan bishop for the Diocese of Chile, Bolivia and Peru (in which he'd served since its 1963 foundation; until then Chile was in the Diocese of the Falkland Islands) — the Bishop of Chile, Bolivia and Peru. In October 1977 and October 1981 the diocese was twice split, and twice Bazley remained as bishop in Chile: first as Bishop of Chile and Bolivia (1977–1981) then Bishop of Chile (1981–2000). While bishop diocesan in Chile, he also served as the Presiding Bishop of the Consejo Anglicano de Sud América (Executive Council for South America; CASA), 1977–1983 and as the Primate of the Province of the Southern Cone of America (the successor to CASA), 1989–1995; and as a member of the Inter-Anglican Theological and Doctrinal Commission, 1994–1997. In 1999, Bazley was one of the Primates to sign a letter of warning to Frank Griswold, Presiding Bishop of The Episcopal Church.

Retirement
Following his retirement back to his native Wirral in 2000, he has been licensed as an honorary assistant bishop in the Diocese of Chester and served as Warden of Readers, 2000–2005, and as Rural Dean of Wallasey, 2009–2011. During his retirement he has been identified by the secessionist Anglican Mission in England as one of five Church of England bishops ready to support them in 2011.

Celebrating the 50th anniversary of his presbyteral ordination in 2019, he was still an honorary assistant bishop in Chester.

References

1935 births
Anglican bishops of Chile, Bolivia and Peru
Anglican bishops of Chile
20th-century Anglican bishops in South America
Living people
Anglican realignment people
Alumni of Trinity College, Bristol